Hojjatabad (also Romanized as Ḩojjatābād; also known as Faraḩābād and Shāhābād) is a village in Zangiabad Rural District, in the Central District of Kerman County, Kerman Province, Iran. At the 2006 census, its population was 2,245, in 510 families.

References 

Populated places in Kerman County